"Talking to the Night" is an Italo disco hit song released in 1985 by Italian singer and actor Brian Ice (real name Fabrizio Rizzolo).

Written in one afternoon, the song turned out to be an unexpected success. Rizzolo would later return to acting, but he kept writing music for acts such as Tony Esposito and Gloria Gaynor.

Track listing 

 Italian 7-inch single

A. "Talking to the Night" – 4:10
B. "Talking to the Night" (Instrumental) – 4:20

 Italian 12-inch single

A. "Talking to the Night" – 6:00
B. "Talking to the Night" (Instrumental) – 6:12

 German 7-inch single

A. "Talking to the Night" – 3:45
B. "Talking to the Night" (Instrumental Version) – 3:34

 German 12-inch maxi single

A. "Talking to the Night" – 6:19
B. "Talking to the Night" (Instrumental Version) – 6:28

References

External links 

 

1985 songs
1985 singles
Memory Records singles
Song articles with missing songwriters